St Andrew St John (born in Bletsoe on 17 January 1732 – died Worcester on 23 March 1795) was Dean of Worcester from 1783 until his death.

He was the second son of John St John, 11th Baron St John of Bletso. He was educated at New College, Oxford. His eldest son Ambrose St John was MP for Callington from 1803 to 1806.

References

1732 births
People from the Borough of Bedford
1795 deaths
Alumni of New College, Oxford
Deans of Worcester
Younger sons of barons